Abele Blanc (born 2 September 1954) is an Italian mountaineer. In 2011, he became the twenty second person to climb the fourteen eight-thousanders, having done so between 1992 and 2011. 

Abele Blanc has summited Mount Everest twice: in 1992 and again in 2010.Best of ExplorersWeb 2011 Awards: Himalayan Knights, Abele Blanc

References

See also
List of Mount Everest summiters by number of times to the summit
List of 20th-century summiters of Mount Everest

Summiters of all 14 eight-thousanders
1954 births
Living people